ESI-PGIMSR and ESIC Medical College & Hospital, Faridabad,  or in its full name Employees' State Insurance Post Graduate Institute of Medical Sciences & Research and Employees' State Insurance Corporation Medical College and Hospital, Faridabad, is a Government co-educational Medical College located at New Industrial Township-3, Faridabad, the industrial capital of India in Haryana, India. 
It was established in 2015 under the aegis of the ESI Corporation, a central autonomous body under Ministry of Labour and Employment, Government of India. Faridabad is a part of the National Capital Region, India (NCR) adjoining Delhi, the Capital City of India. It is affiliated to Pandit Bhagwat Dayal Sharma University of Health Sciences,  Rohtak.
The college is attached to a 625-bedded multi-speciality hospital which was built in 2013 but became operational in 2014. The campus is spread in over 30 acres and provide primary and tertiary healthcare facilities to the workers insured under the ESI corporation and is one of the tertiary care referral center for smaller ESI clinic and dispensaries.

Departments
 Anatomy
 Physiology
 Biochemistry
 Pathology
 Pharmacology
 Microbiology
 Forensic Medicine and Toxicology
 Immunohaematology and Blood Transfusion
 Community Medicine
 Oto-Rhino-Laryngology, Head & Neck Surgery 
 Ophthalmology
 General Medicine
 General Surgery
 Obstetrics and Gynaecology
 Paediatrics
 Orthopaedics
 Respiratory Medicine(Pulmonology)
 Dermatology, Venereology and Leprosy
 Psychiatry
 Radiology
 Anaesthesiology, Pain and Critical Care 
 Emergency Medicine
 Physical Medicine and Rehabilitation 
 Dentistry
 Urology
 Plastic Surgery
 Medical Oncology
 Radiation Oncology
 Surgical Oncology
 Cardiology
 Nephrology
 Rheumatology
 Endocrinology 
 Neurosurgery
 Cardiothoracic and Vascular Surgery 
 Paediatric Surgery
 Occupational Therapy

Courses Offered
Undergraduate: MBBS intake of 125 seats
Postgraduate: MD/MS/MCh/DM intake of 49 seats
Break-up of PG seats
 MD Anaesthesiology 3
 MD Biochemistry 4
 MD Community Medicine 3
 MD Dermatology, Venereology and Leprosy 1
 MD General Medicine 4
 MD Immunohaematology and Blood Transfusion 2
 MD Microbiology 3
 MD Paediatrics 3
 MD Pathology 3
 MD Psychiatry 2
 MD Radio-Diagnosis 3
 MD Respiratory Medicine 2
 MS General Surgery 4
 MS Obstetrics and Gynaecology 4
 MS Ophthalmology 3
 MS Orthopaedics 2
 MS Otorhinolaryngology 3

Hospital Facilities
The hospital offers medical facilities which includes emergency, OPD services, 7 modular Operation Theatres, Labour Room, ICU, HDU, CCU, NICU, Physiotherapy, MRI, CT, Ultrasound scan and IPD services. It also houses a regional dialysis centre.  It was declared a dedicated COVID hospital by the Government of Haryana in April with 510 isolation beds, 60 bedded ICU with 24 ventilators and finest diagnostic facilities. The hospital has got capacity of conducting nearly 750 tests for COVID-19 per day and has done over 35000 RT-PCR tests as of first week of August 2020. The hospital established Haryana's first plasma bank at its Blood Bank Unit. It was jointly inaugurated by Honarable CM of Haryana, Shri Manohar Lal Khattar and Shri Santosh Kumar Gangwar, MoS (Independent Charge), Ministry of Labour and Employment, Govt of India on 7 August 2020.
Super speciality treatment of Reproductive Medicine, Nephrology, Cardiology & Cardio Thoracic Vascular Surgery, Immunology & Rheumatology, Endocrinology, Urology & Genito-Urinary Surgery, Medical & Surgical Oncology, Medical & Surgical Gastroenterology, Neurology & Neurosurgery, Plastic Surgery are provided.
Bone Marrow Transplant Unit is now functional with the first successful transplant performed in October 2021, making it one of the few Government centres in the country to offer BMT.
The hospital premise also houses a state of the art Cardiac Centre with 40 beds and Primary/Elective PCI Catheterization Laboratory  with Surgical Backup.
The Hospital now has expanded to over 920 beds with 60 ICU Beds.
Rare Diseases Clinic is also organised every twice-weekly in collaboration with the Paediatric Department.

Gallery

References

Medical colleges in Haryana
Employees' State Insurance